Wat Bot is a district (amphoe) in the northern part of Phitsanulok province, central Thailand.

History
Tambon Wat Bot was separated from the Phrom Phiram district and created as a minor district (king amphoe) on 1 January 1948. It was upgraded to a full district on 6 June 1956. The present district office was opened on 4 July 1991.

Geography
Neighboring districts are (from the east clockwise), Chat Trakan, Wang Thong, Mueang Phitsanulok, and Phrom Phiram of Phitsanulok Province; Phichai and Thong Saen Khan of Uttaradit province.

Wat Bot lies within the Nan Basin, which is part of the Chao Phraya Watershed. The Khwae Noi River flows through Wat Bot District.

Portions of Wat Bot are part of the Khwae Noi National Reserved Forest, which was recently made part of Kaeng Chet Khwae National Park.

Administration
The district is divided into six sub-districts (tambons), which are further subdivided into 61 villages (mubans). The township (thesaban tambon) Wat Bot covers parts of tambons Wat Bot, Tha Ngam, and Thothae. There are a further six tambon administrative organizations (TAO).

Temples
There are 34 active Buddhist temples in Wat Bo District.

Transportation
The main roadway from Wat Bot to the rest of the province is Phitsanulok-Wat Bot Road.

Khwae Noi Dam project
Construction of the new dam was to have been completed in 2007 on the 60th anniversary of the king's accession to the throne. Among the areas to be irrigated by the dam's reservoir are Tambon Thap Yai Chiang of Phrom Phiram district, and the Thothae and Tha Ngam Subdistricts of Wat Bot. Construction of the dam was completed in 2008.

References

External links
amphoe.com (Thai)

Wat Bot